Asatdas is a populated place in the north-east of Guam. It is located in the village of Yigo, close to Pagat Point.

References

Populated places in Guam
Yigo, Guam